Walter Bird (22 July 1845 – 27 July 1921) was an English cricketer who played first-class cricket in 1880. He was born at Crouch Hall, Hornsey, Middlesex.

Bird made one first-class appearance for the Marylebone Cricket Club (MCC) against Hampshire in 1880 at Day's Ground, Southampton. In the match, which 	Hampshire won by an innings and 38 runs, Bird was dismissed for 13 runs by Frederick Blundell in the MCC first-innings, while in their second-innings he was dismissed by Frederick Jellicoe for a duck.

He died at Upperton, Sussex on 27 July 1921. His brother George, and nephews' Austin and Morice were all first-class cricketers, with Morice playing Test cricket for England.

References

External links
Walter Bird at ESPNcricinfo
Walter Bird at CricketArchive

1845 births
1921 deaths
People from Hornsey
English cricketers
Marylebone Cricket Club cricketers